A patent office is a governmental or intergovernmental organization which controls the issue of patents. In other words, "patent offices are government bodies that may grant a patent or reject the patent application based on whether the application fulfils the requirements for patentability."<ref>European Commission, [http://ec.europa.eu/competition/sectors/pharmaceuticals/inquiry/preliminary_report.pdf Pharmaceutical Sector Inquiry, Preliminary Report (DG Competition Staff Working Paper)], 28 November 2008, page 89 (pdf, 1.95 MB).</ref>

 List of patent offices 
For a list of patent offices and their websites, see the World Intellectual Property Organization (WIPO) maintained list, here.The entries shown in italics are regional or international patent offices.African Regional Intellectual Property Organization (ARIPO)
IP Australia (IPA) 
Barbados Corporate Affairs and Intellectual Property Office (CAIPO)
Canadian Intellectual Property Office (CIPO)
Chinese National Intellectual Property Administration (CNIPA)
Ethiopian Intellectual Property Office (EIPO) European Patent Office (EPO)Eurasian Patent Organization (EAPO)German Patent Office (DPMA)Gulf Cooperation Council (GCC) Patent Office (GCCPO)
Indian Patent Office (IPO)
Intellectual Property Office of Singapore (IPOS)
Israeli Patent Office
Italian Patent and Trademark Office
Japan Patent Office (JPO)
Korean Intellectual Property Office (KIPO)
Mexican Institute of Industrial Property (IMPI)
National Industrial Property Institute, France (INPI)
National Industrial Property Institute, Portugal (INPI)
Netherlands Patent OfficeNordic Patent Institute (NPI)
Norwegian Industrial Property Office"Organisation Africaine de la Propriété Intellectuelle" (OAPI)
Patent Office of the Republic of Latvia
Intellectual Property Organisation of Pakistan (IPO)
Polish Patent Office (PPO)
Russian Federal Service for Intellectual Property, (Rospatent), Russian Federation
Spanish Patent and Trademark Office (SPTO)
Swedish Patent and Registration Office (PRV)
Swiss Federal Institute of Intellectual Property (IGE)
Taiwan Intellectual Property Office (TIPO) Republic of China
Turkish Patent and Trademark Office (TURKPATENT) 
Ukrainian Patent Office (officially 'State Enterprise "Ukrainian Institute of Industrial Property"', or 'SE "UIPV"')
United Kingdom Intellectual Property Office (UK-IPO)
United States Patent and Trademark Office (USPTO) World Intellectual Property Organization (WIPO)

 List of past patent offices or the like 
 Confederate States Patent Office
 "Goskomizobretenie"'' (Soviet Union patent office)
 International Patent Institute

See also 
 Glossary of patent law terms
 Intellectual property organisation
 List of people associated with patent law
 Patent court

References

External links 
 Directory of Intellectual Property Offices (incl. Patent Offices) on the WIPO web site